The General Charter of Jewish Liberties known as the Statute of Kalisz, and the Kalisz Privilege, granted Jews in the Middle Ages special protection and positive discrimination in Poland when they were being persecuted in Western Europe. These rights included exclusive jurisdiction over Jewish matters to Jewish courts, and established a separate tribunal for other criminal matters involving Christians and Jews designed to favour Jewish people. It led to the formation of a Jewish 'state within a state', which attracted Jewish immigrants from across Europe to Poland, which became the center of the world's Jewish community for centuries.

The statute was issued by the Duke of Greater Poland Bolesław the Pious on September 8, 1264 in Kalisz. It was then ratified by subsequent Polish Kings: Casimir III in 1334, Casimir IV in 1453, and Sigismund I in 1539. Jews in Poland were freemen rather than serfs, and so further enjoyed the country's religious toleration codified by the Warsaw Confederation of 1573. The Polish aristocracy developed a unique social contract with Jews, who operated as arendators running businesses such as mills and breweries, and certain bureaucratic tasks to the exclusion of non-Jews, especially tax collection. After Poland expanded into Eastern Orthodox Ukraine, the introduction of the system was a partial cause of the Cossacks' anti-Semitic and anti-Catholic Khmelnytsky Uprising of 1648.

Excerpts 
Following are abridged and translated excerpts from the 36 clauses of the Statute of Kalisz:

Accusations of forgery 
Some Polish researchers, such as the pro-Russian Romuald Hube, having analyzed source documents and claimed that both the original and its authenticated copies could not be found and that the text was a 15th-century forgery done for political purposes.

20th-century edition 
In the 1920s, Polish-Jewish artist and activist Arthur Szyk (1894–1951) illuminated the Statute of Kalisz in a cycle of 45 watercolor and gouache miniature paintings. In addition to the original Latin, Szyk translated the text of the Statute into Polish, Hebrew, Yiddish, Italian, German, English, and Spanish. In 1929, Szyk's Statute miniatures were exhibited throughout Poland, namely in Łódź, Warsaw, Kraków, and Kalisz. With support from the Polish government, selections of the Statute miniatures were exhibited in Geneva in 1931, once again in Poland as part of a 14-city tour in 1932, in London in 1933, in Toronto in 1940, and in New York in 1941 and then, without government patronage, in New York in 1944, 1952, and 1974–75.  In 1932, the Statute of Kalisz was published by Éditions de la Table Ronde de Paris as a collector's luxury limited edition of 500. Szyk's original miniatures are now in the holdings of the Jewish Museum (New York).

See also
History of the Jews in Kalisz
Warsaw Confederation
Religious toleration
Human rights in Poland

References

Further reading
Iwo Cyprian Pogonowski, Jews in Poland. A Documentary History, Hippocrene Books, Inc., 1998, .

1260s in law
1264 in Europe
13th century in Poland
Jewish Polish history
Legal history of Poland
Kalisz